Cowboy Tears is the second major-label studio album by American singer-songwriter Oliver Tree. The album was released on February 18, 2022, through Atlantic Records. A deluxe edition, Cowboy Tears Drown the World in a Swimming Pool of Sorrow, was released on December 23, 2022.

Background 
Prior to the announcement of Cowboy Tears, Tree had stated numerous times that his 2020 debut album Ugly Is Beautiful would be his last release as Oliver Tree and that after its release, he would be retiring from music. However, on June 27, 2021, he made an Instagram post stating that he had come out of retirement to record Cowboy Tears. On October 12, he announced the Cowboy Tears Tour, a North American headlining tour to support the album, which would begin on February 19, 2022. On January 12, 2022, he released the album's lead single "Cowboys Don't Cry" along with a music video starring actress Bella Thorne, and announced that Cowboy Tears would be released on February 18, with the album cover being revealed and preorders being launched. On February 3, the second single, "Freaks & Geeks", was released with a music video. On February 18, the same day as the album's release, the music video for "Swing & a Miss" was released. On May 20, Oliver Tree released the single "I Hate You", and began teasing a deluxe edition of Cowboy Tears. On July 15, another single from the deluxe edition, "Placeholder", was released. On August 9, Oliver Tree revealed in an interview that the deluxe edition would be titled Cowboy Tears Drown the World in a Swimming Pool of Sorrow, and that he had worked with Travis Barker on the project. On December 15, he announced on Instagram that the deluxe edition would be released on December 23. On December 22, a music video for "Suitcase Full of Cash" was released.

Track listing

Personnel
 Oliver Tree – vocals, arrangement, additional mixing
 Jacob Dennis – mixing, engineering, vocal production
 Michelle Mancini – mastering
 Casey Mattson – additional mixing
 Cameron Hogan – engineering assistance (1–5, 10, 12, 13)

Charts

Notes

References 

2022 albums
Oliver Tree albums